Alfred Tatar (born 8 August 1963) is an Austrian former footballer and coach. He is currently employed as a broadcaster for the pay per view television provider British Sky Broadcasting. 

As a player he first started at SC Wiener Neustadt.

He has held positions as a coach at Lokomotiv Moscow, Amkar Perm, Admira Wacker, and SV Ried.

References

1963 births
Living people
Association football midfielders
Austrian footballers
Austrian Football Bundesliga players
Wiener Sport-Club players
First Vienna FC players
Austria youth international footballers
Austrian football managers
SV Ried managers
FC Admira Wacker Mödling managers
First Vienna FC managers
SV Mattersburg managers